Charleston High School may refer to:

 Charleston High School (Missouri)
 Charleston High School (Mississippi)
 Charleston High School (West Virginia), a high school in West Virginia's capital city that closed in 1989
 Charleston High School (Illinois)
 Charleston High School (Arkansas)
 Charleston High School, a former high school in Charleston, Tennessee, replaced by Walker Valley High School.

See also
 Charlestown High School, Charlestown, Boston, Massachusetts